The Palace on Wheels is a luxury tourist train. It was launched by the Indian Railways in association with Rajasthan Tourism Development Corporation to promote tourism in Rajasthan. It is now known as Heritage Palace on Wheels.

The train service was refurbished and relaunched in August 2009 with a new decor, itinerary and cuisine.

History
The concept of the Palace on Wheels was derived from the royal background of the coaches, which were originally meant to be the personal railway coaches of the erstwhile rulers of the princely states of Rajputana, Baroda, the Nizam of Hyderabad and mainly  the Viceroy of British India.

Interiors
Each saloon highlights the cultural ethos of the state, represented through the use of furniture, handicrafts, painting and furnishings.
Jaipur-based Architect Rashmi Gupta did the interiors of the train.

Facilities
There are 14 coaches in the train. 82 tourists can travel in train. Each coach is named after former Rajput states and matches the aesthetics and interiors of the royal past: Alwar, Bharatpur, Bikaner, Bundi, Dholpur, Dungargarh, Jaisalmer, Jaipur, Jhalawar, Jodhpur, Kishangarh, Kota, Sirohi and Udaipur. Each coach has three cabins (named chambers or saloons by the company) with luxury amenities and Wi-Fi internet.
The train has two restaurants, The Mahārāja and The Mahārāni, with a Rajasthani ambience serving continental and Chinese cuisine, one bar-cum-lounge, 14 saloons and a spa.

Route
The train has a 7 nights & 8 days itinerary departs from New Delhi (Day 1), and covers Jaipur (Day 2), Sawai Madhopur and Chittaurgarh (Day 3), Udaipur (Day 4), Jaisalmer (Day 5), Jodhpur (Day 6), Bharatpur and Agra (Day 7), return to New Delhi (Day 8).

See also

Fairy Queen
Royal Orient
Deccan Odyssey
Mahaparinirvan Express
Golden Chariot
Royal Rajasthan on Wheels
Maharajas' Express
Village on Wheels

References

External links
 
Palace On Wheels Official Site - Website of Rajasthan Tourism Development Corporation Ltd. (RTDC), a Government Of Rajasthan Undertaking

Tourism in Rajasthan
Luxury trains in India
Transport in Udaipur